Volodymyr Makar (born 22 January 1990 in Naraiv, Berezhany Raion, Ternopil Oblast, Ukrainian SSR) is a retired professional Ukrainian football midfielder who played for FC Rukh Vynnyky in the Ukrainian First League.

Career
Makar is a product of the different youth sportive schools. His first trainer was Roman Hdanskyi.

He played one season in the Ukrainian Premier League Reserves club FC Lviv. And in 2010 Makar was signed by amateurs team FC Rukh Vynnyky. He was promoted, together with the team, to the Ukrainian Second League and the Ukrainian First League subsequently.

References

External links
Statistics at FFU website (Ukr)

1990 births
Living people
Ukrainian footballers
FC Lviv-2 players
FC Rukh Lviv players
Association football midfielders
Ukrainian First League players
Sportspeople from Ternopil Oblast